Central Mindanao University (CMU) is a research state university located in the heart of Mindanao Island, province of Bukidnon, Philippines. Founded in 1910, it is one of the oldest premier universities in the southern Philippines. CMU is recognized by the Commission on Higher Education (Philippines) as the Center of Excellence in the field of Agriculture, Forestry, Veterinary Medicine and Biology; and Center of Development in Mathematics, Environmental Science and Teacher Education. In 2017, CMU became the first higher education institution in Mindanao to be awarded with Institutional Accreditation (Level II) by the Accrediting Agency of Chartered Colleges and Universities in the Philippines.

History
Central Mindanao University was transformed from a settlement of farm schools organized by the Americans. It started as the Mailag Industrial School in 1910 and offered only the first four grades of the elementary agriculture curriculum. Situated in Mailag, Malaybalay, Bukidnon, this school was opened to address the necessity of training Bukidnons to teach in their own province as it was difficult to recruit non-Bukidnon teachers to serve in newly opened public schools.

In 1918, the school was renamed the Bukidnon Agricultural School and offered the last three grades of the elementary agriculture curriculum. This was later relocated to Managok, Malaybalay, Bukidnon. After a few years it offered the secondary agriculture curriculum. By 1923, the Governor General renamed the school to the Bukidnon Rural High School and allocated 724 hectares for the school's reservation by virtue of Proclamation No. 30.

In 1928, the Philippine Legislature changed the named of the school to Bukidnon Agricultural High School, which was then a secondary agricultural school for male students. In 1938, it was renamed the Bukidnon National Agricultural School which implemented the secondary homemaking curriculum for female students.

After the war, Superintendent Zosimo Montemayor reopened the school but due to its terrible condition caused by World War II, the school was transferred to Musuan, Maramag, Bukidnon, Philippines

Congressman Cesar Fortich of Bukidnon sponsored House Bill 3041, which elevated BNAS into an agricultural state college. On June 21, 1952, President Elpidio Quirino signed Republic Act 807, otherwise known as the Mindanao Agricultural College (MAC) Charter which also installed Zosimo Montemayor as president. This law also paved the way for funding from national, as well as foreign sources. From 1957 to 1960, three Stanford consultants, namely James Wall, Donald Green and John McCleland, lived in the locality and provided technical assistance in agricultural technology.

In 1958, President Carlos Garcia, on recommendation of the Secretary of Agriculture and Natural Resources, issued Proclamation No. 476 granting CMU 3,401 hectares of land. The titling of land began as early as 1961 before the Court of First Instance of Bukidnon to determine the rights of adverse claimants, if there were any. By June 19, 1965, R.A. 4498 catapulted MAC to the Central Mindanao University with Montemayor as the first President.

In 1974, the 1971 Cadastral Court decision for the segregation of several hectares was amended for humanitarian reason and the government's agrarian program. The 321.9 hectares were properly segregated and given to legitimate claimants and CMU was granted title for 3,080 hectares.

The current CMU president is Dr. Maria Luisa Rupac Soliven. She was elected by the CMU Board of Regents on December 15, 2010. She previously served as the vice-president for Academic Affairs, and before that as the first female Dean of the College of Agriculture of CMU. She is the eighth CMU president. She was inducted on December 30, 2010, taking over the previous officer-in-charge, Dr. Victor M. Barroso. The former CMU presidents are Dr. Amado Campos, Dr. Isabelo S. Alcordo, Dr. Rodolfo Nayga, Dr. Leonardo Chua, Dr. Jaime Gellor, and Dr. Mardonio M. Lao.

Media

Publications
CMU Journal of Science is a peer-reviewed multidisciplinary journal published annually by Central Mindanao University. This official scientific journal of the university is accredited by the Philippine Commission on Higher Education (CHED) as Category B. It publishes quality research in the fields of natural sciences, mathematics, engineering, and social sciences from local, national, and international contributors.

Radio
Since 2007, the university has its own radio station called 88.9 Development Radio (DXMU 88.9 MHz). Its studios are located at the Research and Extension Complex inside the Campus, and its transmitter is located at Mount Musuan, Maramag, Bukidnon.

See also
Central Mindanao University Laboratory High School

References

External links
Official Website

Universities and colleges in Bukidnon
State universities and colleges in the Philippines
Mindanao Association State Colleges and Universities Foundation
Philippine Association of State Universities and Colleges
Educational institutions established in 1910
1910 establishments in the Philippines